United Finance started its journey as a non-banking financial institution in 1989. They are affiliated with Duncan Brothers (Bangladesh) Limited, Camellia PLC (United Kingdom) and Lawrie Group PLC (United Kingdom) and its associated concerns who have a combined presence of over 150 years in Bangladesh. and changed into United Finance in 2014. It is listed in DSE. It provides financial services, such as investment, lease, loan, term finance, channel financing. The company was founded in 1989 and is headquartered in Dhaka, Bangladesh. United Finance collect around 80 percent of their funds directly from individual depositors.

The company has 25 branch offices across the country covering all 64 districts with financial services. The company has branch office in Dhaka, Bongshal, Gazipur, Tejgaon, Jinjira, Narsingdi, Shyamoli, Chattogram, Begumganj, Cox's Bazar, Cumilla, Rangamati, Jashore, Bogura, Sylhet, Rangpur, Dinajpur, Chuadanga, Barishal, Noakhali, Rajshahi, Khulna, Gazipur, Pabna, Belkuchi and Mymensingh district.

Major sponsorship 
United Finance along with United Insurance would regularly organize international chess tournaments till 2009. The tournament was held biannually, and in 2009 it was hosted for the 9th time.

References

External links 
 Official Website

Financial services companies established in 1989
Financial services companies of Bangladesh
1989 establishments in Bangladesh
Leasing companies
Companies listed on the Dhaka Stock Exchange